Comella laetifica is a moth in the  family Callidulidae. It is found on Aru and in New Guinea.

References

Callidulidae
Moths described in 1860